Sutham Sangprathum (born October 26, 1953) is a Thai politician of the Thai Rak Thai Party. He was deputy minister of the Ministry of Interior from 2004 to 2005.

He received a BA in Law at Chulalongkorn University and an MBA at Kasetsart University. Before becoming Deputy Interior Minister, he was the Minister of University Affairs of Thailand and Vice President of the National Assembly of Thailand.

References

  泰国新政府的华裔光芒

Sutham Sangprathum
1953 births
Living people
Sutham Sangprathum
Sutham Sangprathum
Sutham Sangprathum
Sutham Sangprathum